The 1982 Northwestern State Demons football team represented Northwestern State University as an independent during the 1982 NCAA Division I-AA football season. Led by eighth-year head coach A. L. Williams, the Demons compiled a record of 6–5.

Schedule

Roster

References

Northwestern State
Northwestern State Demons football seasons
Northwestern State Demons football